Oja is an Estonian and Finnish surname meaning "stream" and "brook" in both languages, as well as "ditch" in Finnish. As of 2019, there were 1,891 people with the surname in Estonia: 926 men and 965 women. Oja is ranked as the 15th most common surname in Estonia. People bearing the surname Oja include:

Andres Oja (born 1983), Estonian actor
Bruno O'Ya (born Bruno Oja; 1933–2002), Estonian-Polish actor
Dagmar Oja (born 1981), Estonian singer
Eduard Oja (1905–1950), Estonian composer, conductor, music teacher and critic
Erkki Oja (born 1948), Finnish computer scientist
Eve Oja (born 1948), Estonian mathematician
Hannu Oja (born 1950), Finnish statistician
Kristjan Oja (born 1968) Estonian biathlete
Pääru Oja (born 1989), Estonian actor 
Peeter Oja (born 1960), Estonian actor, singer, comedian and media personality
Regina Oja (born 1996), Estonian biathlete
Rein Oja (born 1956), Estonian actor
Silva Oja (born 1961), Estonian heptathlete
Tarmo Oja (born 1934), Estonian-Swedish astronomer
Tasuja Oja (1888–1946), Estonian politician and civil servant
Tõnu Oja (born 1958), Estonian actor

As a given name
Oja Kodar (born 1941), Croatian actress, screenwriter and director

References

Estonian-language surnames
Finnish-language surnames